Kerem Şeras (born 1 January 1984) is a Turkish football player. He plays as midfielder.

References

External links
 
 
 

1984 births
Footballers from Ankara
Living people
Turkish footballers
Turkey under-21 international footballers
Association football midfielders
Hacettepe S.K. footballers
Gençlerbirliği S.K. footballers
MKE Ankaragücü footballers
Antalyaspor footballers
Kasımpaşa S.K. footballers
Ankaraspor footballers
Göztepe S.K. footballers
Kastamonuspor footballers
Tuzlaspor players
Süper Lig players
TFF First League players
TFF Second League players